In mathematics, a divisibility sequence is an integer sequence  indexed by positive integers n such that

for all m, n.  That is, whenever one index is a multiple of another one, then the corresponding term also is a multiple of the other term.  The concept can be generalized to sequences with values in any ring where the concept of divisibility is defined.

A strong divisibility sequence is an integer sequence  such that for all positive integers m, n,

Every strong divisibility sequence is a divisibility sequence:  if and only if . Therefore by the strong divisibility property,  and therefore .

Examples
 Any constant sequence is a strong divisibility sequence.
 Every sequence of the form  for some nonzero integer k, is a divisibility sequence.
 The numbers of the form  (Mersenne numbers) form a strong divisibility sequence.
 The repunit numbers in any base  form a strong divisibility sequence.
 More generally, any sequence of the form  for integers  is a divisibility sequence.
 The Fibonacci numbers  form a strong divisibility sequence.
 More generally, any Lucas sequence of the first kind  is a divisibility sequence. Moreover, it is a strong divisibility sequence when .
 Elliptic divisibility sequences are another class of such sequences.

References
 
 
 
 
 
 

Sequences and series
Integer sequences
Arithmetic functions